Andrew Wisniewski (born September 1, 1981) is an American former professional basketball player. He played at the point guard position.

College career
Wisniewski initially played for the St. Peter's Peacocks for the 1999–00 season, where he played 18 of 28 games while starting 3, and averaged 11 minutes per game. From 2001 to 2004, Wisniewski played in NCAA Division I for Centenary College of Louisiana, where he earned the nickname "Wiz". During his time at Centenary, Wisniewski started and played in a total of 83 games.  For his three-year average, he averaged 34 minutes and 21 points per game.

Professional career
Wisniewski went undrafted in the 2004 NBA Draft.

For the 2004–05 season he signed with the Serbian club Crvena zvezda. In 23 games of the Adriatic League, he averaged 12 points, 2.4 rebounds and 3.3 assists per game.

For the 2005–06 season he signed with Telekom Baskets Bonn of the German Bundesliga. He was the top scorer of the Bundesliga, with an average of 20.6 points, and was also selected to play at the Bundesliga All-Star Game.

In July 2006, he signed with Snaidero Cucine Udine of the Italian Lega Basket Serie A. He was released in November 2006, after just 9 games. In December 2006, he signed with the Croatian club Cibona Zagreb for the remainder of the season. With Cibona he won the Croatian A-1 Liga.

In July 2007, he signed with PBC Ural Great Perm of Russia for the 2007–08 season. For the 2008–09 season he signed with another Russian club Spartak Saint Petersburg.

In July 2009, he signed a one-year contract with an option for an additional year with the Israeli club Maccabi Tel Aviv. With Maccabi he won the Israeli Cup and was named the MVP of the final game. In July 2010, Maccabi announced that they will not be exercising their option on him for the 2010–11 season.

In June 2010, he signed with the Turkish club Efes Pilsen. After Efes was eliminated from the EuroLeague in February 2011, he was released.

In January 2012, he signed with Spirou Charleroi of Belgium for the rest of the 2011–12 season.

Career statistics

College statistics

European statistics

References

External links
 Euroleague.net profile
 FIBA Europe profile
 Eurobasket.com profile
 Italian League profile 

1981 births
Living people
ABA League players
American expatriate basketball people in Belgium
American expatriate basketball people in Croatia
American expatriate basketball people in Germany
American expatriate basketball people in Israel
American expatriate basketball people in Italy
American expatriate basketball people in Russia
American expatriate basketball people in Serbia
American expatriate basketball people in Turkey
American men's basketball players
Anadolu Efes S.K. players
BC Spartak Saint Petersburg players
Centenary Gentlemen basketball players
KK Cibona players
KK Crvena zvezda players
Maccabi Tel Aviv B.C. players
Pallalcesto Amatori Udine players
PBC Ural Great players
Point guards
Saint Peter's Peacocks men's basketball players
St. Peter's Boys High School alumni
Spirou Charleroi players
Sportspeople from Staten Island
Basketball players from New York City
Telekom Baskets Bonn players